Julian Ringhof (born 21 February 1989) is a former professional footballer who played as a centre-back.

Career

College and amateur
Ringhof played five years of college soccer split between time at California State University, Los Angeles and the University of San Diego.

Professional
Ringhof signed with United Soccer League club Rochester Rhinos on 25 March 2015. The next season, he was signed by Arizona United SC on 18 February 2016.

References

External links
 

1989 births
Living people
German footballers
Association football defenders
USL Championship players
Regionalliga players
San Diego Toreros men's soccer players
Rochester New York FC players
Phoenix Rising FC players
FSV Optik Rathenow players
German expatriate footballers
German expatriate sportspeople in the United States
Expatriate soccer players in the United States